Megan Nicole Green (née Flores, born September 1, 1993), simply known as Megan Nicole, is an American singer-songwriter and actress who debuted on YouTube in 2009.

Early life
Megan Nicole was born in Houston, Texas to parents Tammy and Frankie Flores, she has a sister named Maddie Taylor. Her mother is of German and Native American descent and her father is Mexican American. She was raised in Katy, Texas and became interested in music around age 10, when her father purchased a karaoke machine for her. Nicole also participated in her church's music programs, taking part in a church band during high school and choir during middle school.

Career
In 2009, Nicole uploaded her first video to YouTube, her cover of "Use Somebody" by Kings of Leon. She followed with more covers on her YouTube channel, which includes songs by Bruno Mars, Katy Perry, Demi Lovato, Miley Cyrus, Taylor Swift, Selena Gomez, One Direction, Echosmith and other artists. She has several collaborations from fellow YouTube artists such as Tiffany Alvord, Alyssa Bernal, Madilyn Bailey, Tyler Ward, Dave Days, Conor Maynard and Lindsey Stirling.

Nicole released her first original song, "B-e-a-utiful", on July 15, 2011. Written by Nicole, Lairs Johnston, Stephen Folden, and Tom Mgrdichian, the "pop ditty" received one million hits after two days and had 27 million hits by November 2013.

In August 2012, Nicole signed with Bad Boy Records. In September 2012, Nicole reached number 29 on the Billboard Social 50 in her fourth week on the popularity chart.

An April 2014 article in The News Tribune said that on YouTube, Nicole had 1.5 million subscribers and 350 million video views. She also performed at the Pre-Show Party for the 2014 Radio Disney Music Awards.

On August 19, 2014, Nicole released her single "Electrified". This was her first single off of her debut album Escape, which is an independent release on Hume Records, following her departure from Bad Boy Records. Escape has 5 new, original songs all co-written by Nicole and Mgrdichian and is released on October 14, 2014. The 80's-inspired music video for "Electrified" premiered on People.com on September 16, 2014.

Nicole then starred in her first feature film Summer Forever alongside Alyson Stoner and Anna Grace Barlow, it was released on September 4, 2015, through video on demand. In 2017, Nicole performed "Get Your Cape On", a cover of the theme song from the animated web series DC Super Hero Girls, originally performed by Jordyn Kane.

Personal life
In March 2017, Nicole became engaged to Cooper Green. They were married on July 1, 2017.

Discography

EP

Singles

Soundtrack appearances

Videography

Filmography

Film

Web

References

External links

 
 
 

1993 births
American musicians of Mexican descent
Living people
YouTubers from Texas
Fullscreen (company) people
American film actresses
21st-century American singers
21st-century American actresses
21st-century American women musicians
Hispanic and Latino American women singers
Hispanic and Latino American actresses
American actresses of Mexican descent